The Shanghai Document is an early documentary film. This silent film was directed by Yakov Bliokh (Яков Блиох,1895-1957) and was released in the USSR in 1928.

The film portrays Shanghai, China in the early 1920s. It shows the contrasts between the world of Western expatriates (including Britons, Americans, New Zealanders, Australians, and Danes) who live in the luxurious Shanghai International Settlement, and that of the Shanghainese inhabitants, who spend their days laboring.

The events which inspired the film revolve around the Chinese nationalist revolution (1925–27), including the May Thirtieth Movement, and the First United Front of the Chinese Communist Party, and the Nationalists (the Kuomintang), and its collapse in February 1927 when Chiang Kai-shek ordered a purge of the Communists in Shanghai and in other cities held by the revolutionaries.

Related documentary films
Other notable portrayals of this period include André Malraux's La Condition Humaine (The Human Condition, or originally translated as Man's Fate. An early documentary account was Harold Isaacs', The Tragedy of the Chinese Revolution (1938).

(35mm/black and white/silent/54min)

External links
 

1928 films
Soviet documentary films
Soviet silent feature films
1928 documentary films
Black-and-white documentary films
China–Soviet Union relations
Shanghai International Settlement
Soviet black-and-white films
German silent feature films
German black-and-white films
German documentary films
1920s German films